Saving Santa is a 2013 British computer-animated comedy film created and written by Tony Nottage and directed by Leon Joosen, produced by Tony Nottage, Terry Stone and Nick Simunek. The film was released direct-to-video.

Plot 
A lowly stable elf finds that he is the only one who can stop an invasion of the North Pole by using the secret of Santa's Sleigh, a TimeGlobe, to travel back in time to Save Santa, twice.

Voice cast 
 Martin Freeman as Bernard D. Elf
 Tim Curry as Neville Baddington
 Noel Clarke as Snowy
 Tim Conway as Santa
 Pam Ferris as Mrs. Clause
 Ashley Tisdale as Shiny
 Joan Collins as Vera Baddington
 Chris Barrie as Blitzen
 Nicholas Guest as Chestnut
 Richard Steven Horvitz as Orange Haired Elf and Chestnut
 Rebecca Ferdinando as Valley Girl Elf
 Craig Fairbrass as The Mercenary
 Terry Stone as Mercenary
 Alex Walkinshaw as Reporter

Release 
It was released in the United Kingdom on November 1, 2013 on Blu-ray and DVD by The Weinstein Company and Anchor Bay Entertainment.

Reception 
The film received negative critical reviews. On review aggregator Rotten Tomatoes, the film holds a score of  based on  critical reviews.

See also
 List of Christmas films
 Santa Claus in film

References

External links 
 

2013 films
2013 comedy films
2013 computer-animated films
2010s Christmas comedy films
British Christmas comedy films
British computer-animated films
Animated Christmas films
Animated films about time travel
Gateway Films films
2010s English-language films
2010s British films